Thomas London may refer to:

 Tom London (1889–1963), American actor
 Tom London (magician) (born 1991), close-up magician and radio personality

See also
Thomas Becket, otherwise known as Thomas of London